The name Dagohoy may refer to:

 Dagohoy, Bohol, a town in Bohol, Philippines
 Dagohoy Rebellion, the longest revolt or rebellion in Philippine history (1744-1829)
 Francisco Dagohoy, real name Francisco Sendrijas, the individual who led the Dagohoy Revolt